Albert Marc Chichery (12 October 1888 – 15 August 1944) was a French politician who was briefly Minister of Commerce and Industry, then Minister of Agriculture and Food Supply, in June–July 1940.

Early years

Albert Marc Chichery was born on 12 October 1888 in Le Blanc, Indre.
He completed his secondary education at the Collège du Blanc, then began working for his parents' business.
They ran a butcher's shop in Le Blanc.
He was called up for military service, which he completed as an officer of the reserve. In World War I (1914–18) he served with the 135th infantry regiment.
He rose to the rank of Lieutenant.
After the war he founded a factory that made bicycles, with considerable success.
Production rose to 25,000 annually in a factory with 150 employees. 
His business owned the "Dion-Bouton" brand. 
His "Dilecta" brand bicycles won all the major road races.

Political career

Chichery was elected to the municipal council, then to the general council of the Indre department.
He was elected to the legislature on the second ballot in the general elections of 1–8 May 1932 for Le Blanc constituency.
He sat with the Radical Republican and Radical Socialist group.
He was reelected on the second ballot in May 1936.
He became president of the Radical group in the chamber.
He stated, "from the ideological point of view, Radical doctrine best embodies the Cartesian spirit of our country. ... In the words of President Herriot, Radicalism is the political applications of rationalism, that particularly French quality."
Chichery was not a strong Radical leader, and mainly served as the instrument of Édouard Daladier for managing the deputies.

At the time of the Munich crisis, at the urging of Colonel André Laffargue, Chichery pressed Daladier to appoint Maxime Weygand head of the armed forces.
During World War II (1939–45), when the Reynaud–Daladier cabinet was formed on 22 March 1940, Chichery told Reynaud, "The only thing left for you to do is resign."
On 5 June 1940 Chichery was named Minister of Commerce and Industry  in the cabinet of Paul Reynaud in place of Léon Baréty, who had resigned on 18 May 1940. 
The Reynaud cabinet was dissolved on 16 June 1940, and Chichery was appointed  Minister of Agriculture and Food Supply in the cabinet of Philippe Pétain, holding office until 12 July 1940.
He succeeded Henri Queuille as Minister of Supplies and Paul Thellier as Minister of Agriculture.
He was succeeded by Paul Caziot.

At the Congress of Vichy Chichery voted to grant the constitutional powers requested by Pétain, and became a member of the National Council of the Vichy government.
During the liberation of France Chichery was abducted from his property near Le Blanc on 15 August 1944 and killed in the nearby woods by a bullet through the neck.

Notes

Sources

Further reading

1888 births
1944 deaths
People from Le Blanc
Politicians from Centre-Val de Loire
Radical Party (France) politicians
French Ministers of Agriculture
French Ministers of Commerce and Industry
Members of the 15th Chamber of Deputies of the French Third Republic
Members of the 16th Chamber of Deputies of the French Third Republic